Cape George is a cape and community on the shores of Bras d'Or Lake in Richmond County, Nova Scotia, Canada.

References

Communities in Richmond County, Nova Scotia